Johnny Griffin Sextet is an album by jazz saxophonist Johnny Griffin and his all-star sextet, released on the Riverside label in 1958. It was Griffin's first album as leader on Riverside, and was recorded the day before the Way Out! session dates.

Track listing
"Stix' Trix" (Wilbur Campbell) - 7:43
"What's New?" (Bob Haggart, Johnny Burke) - 7:53
"Woody 'n' You" (Dizzy Gillespie) - 6:12
"Johnny G.G." (John Hines) - 9:45
"Catharsis" (Johnny Griffin) - 9:56

Personnel
Johnny Griffin — tenor saxophone
Pepper Adams - baritone saxophone (not on "Woody 'n' You")
Donald Byrd - trumpet (not on "Woody 'n' You")
Kenny Drew — piano
Wilbur Ware — bass
Philly Joe Jones — drums

References 

1958 albums
Pepper Adams albums
Johnny Griffin albums
Kenny Drew albums
Donald Byrd albums
Philly Joe Jones albums